Thomas William Hassell (5 April 1919 – April 1984) was an English professional footballer who played as an inside left in the Football League for Aldershot and Brighton & Hove Albion.

Life and career
Hassell was born in Eastleigh, Hampshire, in 1919. He joined Southampton as a youngster, and played for them in the wartime competitions, as well as making guest appearances for a variety of other clubs, but moved on to Aldershot before the Football League resumed in 1946. In a four-year spell, Hassell made 114 appearances in the Football League Third Division South for Aldershot. He spent the 1950–51 season as a part-time professional with another Third Division club, Brighton & Hove Albion, for which he had played during the war, and then spent another three years with Folkestone Town. In 1954, he resumed amateur status and acted as player-coach of Sussex County League club Lewes for four seasons, and then played for Bexhill Town and Newhaven.

He returned to Albion as assistant trainer from 1964 to 1967. Outside football, Hassell worked in the Brighton railway workshops as a fitter. He died in Hove, Sussex, in 1984.

References

1919 births
1984 deaths
People from Eastleigh
English footballers
Association football inside forwards
Southampton F.C. players
Aldershot F.C. players
Brighton & Hove Albion F.C. players
Folkestone F.C. players
Lewes F.C. players
Newhaven F.C. players
English Football League players
Brighton & Hove Albion F.C. wartime guest players
Chelsea F.C. wartime guest players
Luton Town F.C. wartime guest players
Millwall F.C. wartime guest players
Brighton & Hove Albion F.C. non-playing staff